This is a list of States and Union Territories of India by speakers of Sindhi as of census 2001. Gross population figures are  available online.

See also
States of India by urban population
States of India by size of economy

Sindhi speakers
Sindhi language